The 1969 Ballon d'Or,  given to the best football player in Europe as judged by a panel of sports journalists from UEFA member countries, was awarded to the Italian midfielder Gianni Rivera (Milan) on 23 December 1969. There were 26 voters, from Austria, Belgium, Bulgaria, Czechoslovakia, Denmark, East Germany, England, Finland, France, Greece, Hungary, Italy, Luxembourg, the Netherlands, Norway, Poland, Portugal, Republic of Ireland, Romania, Soviet Union, Spain, Sweden, Switzerland, Turkey, West Germany and Yugoslavia. Rivera became the second Italian to win the award, after Omar Sívori in 1961. He was also the first Milan player to win the trophy.

Rankings

References

External links
 France Football Official Ballon d'Or page

1969
1969–70 in European football